Scott Tannas (born February 25, 1962) is a Canadian senator and, since November 5, 2019, leader of the Canadian Senators Group, a parliamentary caucus.

Tannas is the former President/CEO and founder of Western Financial Group (formerly Hi-Alta Capital Inc.), an insurance brokerage, life insurance and banking company headquartered in High River, Alberta, Canada. Tannas was elected as a senator-in-waiting in the 2012 Alberta Senate nominee election, and appointed to the Senate following the retirement of Senator Bert Brown on March 22, 2013.

Outside of politics, Tannas runs the Alberta-based Western Investment Company of Canada, a private equity firm.

Early life and education
Tannas was born in High River, Alberta, Canada on February 25, 1962, the son of Donald Tannas, (a school teacher/principal, Member of the Legislative Assemblies and Deputy Speaker of Alta Legislature) and Christine Tannas (a nurse).

Tannas has spent the majority of his life in High River, except for a 2-year period, where his parents served with the Canadian International Development Agency in Uganda.

Tannas attended and graduated from École Senator Riley School in 1979 . Tannas also worked the local dance club scene as a DJ and was known for his sound system and light show. At the age of 26, Tannas got a job in the tourism industry working at the Banff Springs Hotel.

Tannas attended both Mount Royal College (now called Mount Royal University), and the University of Calgary. While attending university, Tannas met Taryn McCormick, the daughter of Michael James Sr and Gweneth Helen McCormick, whose family started the Riley & McCormick Western Wear family in 1901.

Businesses and career

After leaving college, Tannas stayed in the Calgary and Banff area working in the tourism industry andtaking side jobs to build up capital. Tannas had accumulated enough capital to move back to his hometown of High River and purchased Hi-Alta Agencies, an  established insurance firm in town, which had been operating since 1905.

In May 1996, Hi-Alta changed its name to Western Financial Group to allow for expansion outside of Alberta. In 2001, Western Financial Group's insurance division, WFG Agency Network Inc. became the largest insurance broker network in western Canada. In January 2003, Tannas, along with the board of directors at Western Financial Group, created their own bank: Bank West, which took in over $1 million in deposits in its first day of business.

As of 2021, Tannas runs the Western Investment Company of Canada while serving as a senator.

Charity and awards
Tannas  started The Western Communities Foundation, a non-profit organization created to support the communities in which Western Financial Group operates in 2001. He is also an honorary board member of SOS Children's Villages - Canada.

In 2003, Scott Tannas was awarded Ernst and Young's Prairies Entrepreneur of the Year for Professional/Financial Services.

Political career
Tannas' father, Don Tannas was a Member of the Legislative Assembly of Alberta and Deputy Speaker of Alberta Legislature. He ventured into politics himself in 1993, as campaign manager for Ken Hughes who at the time was the Progressive Conservative MP for Macleod in the House of Commons of Canada.  Tannas was a candidate for the Alberta's Progressive Conservative Party in the 2012 Alberta Senate nominee election, and was elected as second out of three senator-in-waiting positions receiving 349,396 votes. He was appointed to the Senate following the retirement of Senator Bert Brown on March 22, 2013.

On November 4, 2019, he joined the Canadian Senators Group, which, like the Independent Senators Group, requires no political affiliation and, so, he ceased to be a member of the Conservative Party of Canada. At the same time, the CSG selected Senator Tannas as its interim leader.

Over the 2020–2021 winter holidays, Tannas travelled to Hawaii despite public health advice discouraging non-essential international travel during the COVID-19 pandemic in Canada. Tannas said that he had followed all the rules and health protocols required to undertake international travel and that he would shortly be returning to Alberta.

Personal life 
Tannas lives in High River, Alberta. He owns a timeshare property in Hawaii.

References

1962 births
Living people
Businesspeople from Alberta
Canadian chief executives
Canadian senators-in-waiting from Alberta
People from High River
21st-century Canadian politicians
Canadian Senators Group